The 2021 season for  was the team's second season as a UCI WorldTeam and its seventh season overall.

Roster 

Riders who joined the team for the 2021 season

Riders who left the team during or after the 2020 season

Season victories

National, Continental, and World Champions

Notes

References

External links 

 

Israel Start-Up Nation
2021
Israel Start-Up Nation